Romosozumab, sold under the brand name Evenity, is a medication used to treat osteoporosis. It has been found to decrease the risk of fractures of the spine.

Common side effect include headache, joint pain, and pain at the site of injection. It may increase the risk of heart attacks, strokes, and deaths from cardiovascular disease. It is a humanized monoclonal antibody that targets sclerostin.  Research shows the drug increases bone formation and decreases bone resorption in postmenopausal women with low bone density. Romosozumab was approved for medical use in Japan, the United States and the European Union in 2019.

The U.S. Food and Drug Administration (FDA) considers it to be a first-in-class medication.

Medical uses

Romosozumab is used for osteoporosis to decrease the risk of fractures.
Two trials found that it reduced the rate of vertebral fracture. In one, there was a 73% lower risk of vertebral fracture after one year, and the benefit was maintained after a second year of taking denosumab. In the other, one year of romosozumab followed by one year of alendronate had a 50% vertebral fracture reduction compared to two years of alendronate.

Side effects
Common side effects include headache, joint pain, and pain at the site of injection. 

In one trial, more patients in the romosozumab group had serious cardiovascular events compared to the alendronate group (0.8% vs 0.3%), though this was not found in a trial of romosozumab vs placebo. Currently, the drug contains a boxed warning on its labeling stating that it may increase the risk of heart attack, stroke and cardiovascular death and should not be used in patients who have had a heart attack or stroke within the previous year.

History
Romosozumab was approved for medical use in Japan in January 2019, the United States in April 2019 and the European Union in December 2019.
It was originally discovered by Chiroscience, which was acquired by Celltech (now owned by UCB). Celltech entered in a partnership with Amgen in 2002 for the product's development.

UK's NICE provisionally decided not to recommend Romosozumab for use in England and Wales.

References

External links
 
 

Amgen
Monoclonal antibodies